Dmitri Sergeyevich Sachkov (born 13 January 1976) is a former Russian professional football player.

Club career
He played in the Russian Football National League for FC Saturn-1991 St. Petersburg in 1995.

Honours
 Russian Second Division Zone West top scorer: 2000 (22 goals), 2001 (21 goals).

References

1976 births
Living people
Russian footballers
Association football forwards
FC Sibir Novosibirsk players
FC Dynamo Saint Petersburg players
FC Lokomotiv Saint Petersburg players
FC Sheksna Cherepovets players